GB Group can mean:

 GB Group (conglomerate), a diversified business conglomerate based in Port-au-Prince, Haiti
 GB Group (UK), an identity management, location intelligence and fraud prevention company
 GB Group, the parent company of Stockport-based contractor and developer GB Building Solutions
 GB Group, a supermarket chain owned by GIB Group
 GB Foods, a Barcelona-based food and beverages company with operations across Europe and Africa, owned by Agrolimen